This is a list of diseases of hemp (Cannabis sativa).

Bacterial diseases

Fungal diseases

Nematodes, parasitic

Viral diseases

Phytoplasmal diseases

Miscellaneous diseases and disorders

References 

 Common Names of Diseases, The American Phytopathological Society
The Pacific Northwest Plant Disease Management Handbook

Hemp
 List
Hemp diseases